Raymond Ochoa (born October 12, 2001) is an American actor He has appeared in various commercials, television shows and movies including roles in 10 Items or Less, Merry Christmas, Drake & Josh, and the lead character, Arlo, in the Pixar film The Good Dinosaur. He has also made a number of video game appearances with his most recognizable being Gabriel Garcia in The Walking Dead: A New Frontier.

Biography 
Ochoa was born on October 12, 2001 in San Diego, California. He is the younger brother of actors Ryan and Robert Ochoa. He is of Mexican, Filipino, Italian, Irish and Russian-Jewish descent.

In 2007, he starred in commercials for Betty Crocker, Verizon FiOS, and Chevrolet. He made his debut by playing Manuelito, a minor role in the television series 10 Items or Less in 2006. He appeared in the television series Cold Case, and Hank.

Ochoa is in the band Ochoa Boyz, formed by him and his brothers Ryan, Rick, and Robert.

His ancestry includes Mexican, Filipino, Italian, Irish, and Russian Jewish. Ochoa has one son, Raymond Michael Ochoa, who was born in December 2021.

Filmography

Film

Television

Video games

References

External links 

2001 births
Living people
21st-century American male actors
American male child actors
American male film actors
American male television actors
American male video game actors
American male voice actors
American people of Mexican descent
American people of Russian-Jewish descent
Hispanic and Latino American male actors
Male actors from San Diego